Alcyoneus is a Giant, and opponent of Heracles in Greek mythology.

Alcyoneus or Alkyoneus may also refer to:
 Alcyoneus, a character in Rick Riordan's The Heroes of Olympus novels; see list of characters in mythology novels by Rick Riordan
 Hylaeus alcyoneus, a bee species endemic to Australia
 Alcyoneus (Son of Diomos), a figure in Greek mythology, intended as a sacrifice to the monster Sybaris
 Alcyoneus, a character mentioned in Quintus Smyrnaeus' epic poem Posthomerica (2.364), in which he is a member of the Ethiopian army, fighting on the side of the Trojans in the Trojan War
 Alcyoneus, an alternate name for Ischys, the son of Elatus and Hippea, and also the lover of Coronis
 Alcyoneus, the son of Antigonus II Gonatas
 Alcyoneus (galaxy), an unusually large radio galaxy